James Demetriou (born 7 June 1955) is a former Australian rules football player. He later worked as a lawyer and set up the charity Sports Without Borders Australian Sports Technologies Network.

Biography
Demetriou was born to Tony and Chrysi Demetriou in 1955. His father was an immigrant from Cyprus who ran a fish and chips shop. 

Demetriou is an experienced Senior Executive/ Director in Mergers and Acquisition /cross border investment , specialist advisor in Asian investment and listed and large private board governance advisor and has sat on many government, large private and listed company boards. He has been an Asset manager  of various funds particularly around Sports/ Digital health, Clean Energy, Leisure and hospitality and been involved in many major company turnarounds. He has an extensive knowledge of technology that measures, evaluates and advises on performance of companies in the financial , education , real estate and sports sectors. He has represented the University of Melbourne, Australian Sports Technologies Network, the Victorian Government and Austrade at many Asian Conferences and trade missions as well as presenting to many international forums.

He also is the Founding Chairman of Australian Sports Technologies Network (ASTN) and he is one of the Australia’s leaders most respected leaders in Sports Business, Sports Governance and Sports Technology.  James has played a major role in Australian sport over the past 40 years as a senior player at the Essendon Football Club (1975-1976), a Board Director of Essendon Football Club in the mid to late 90s.  He was the founding Chair, Sports Without Borders ( 2006 to 2016. He holds a Master of International Business, University of Melbourne, Australia, •Bachelor of Laws,  University of Melbourne, Australia Alumni of The Anderson School of Business, Global GAP program, UCLA, USA.

Demetriou married Toni Demetriou ( Nee Ryan)> ( 1978-  )   and has 3 children Thomas  ( b.1979), Lauren ( b. 1981)  and Tim ( b. 1984). He has 3 brothers George( b.1957) Phiv ( b.1958) and Andrew Demetriou  ( b. 1961) was CEO of the Australian Football League (AFL).

Playing career

During a match against  in 1976 he broke his leg after tripping on a sprinkler, ending his top level career.

References

1955 births
Essendon Football Club players
Brunswick Football Club players
Pascoe Vale Football Club players
Australian people of Greek Cypriot descent
Australian rules footballers from Melbourne
Lawyers from Melbourne
Living people
People from Carlton, Victoria